Thomas Slick Ehlers (born July 14, 1952) is a former American football linebacker. He played professionally in the National Football League (NFL) for the Philadelphia Eagles and the Buffalo Bills.  Ehlers played college football at the University of Kentucky and was drafted in the 13th round of the 1975 NFL Draft by the Eagles. He currently resides in Mishawaka, Indiana.  Ehlers is the son of former National Basketball Association player Bulbs Ehlers.  In 1988, he joined his father in the Indiana Football Hall of Fame.

References

1952 births
Living people
American football linebackers
Buffalo Bills players
Kentucky Wildcats football players
Philadelphia Eagles players
People from Mishawaka, Indiana
Players of American football from South Bend, Indiana